"There's the Girl" is a song recorded by the American rock band, Heart. It was composed by Holly Knight and Heart band member Nancy Wilson. "There's The Girl" was released in a remixed version as the third single from Heart's ninth studio album, Bad Animals. Knight is known as a very successful songwriter who was responsible for penning many hit singles during the 1980s.

Like Heart's 1986 #1 single "These Dreams", the lead vocals on "There's the Girl" were performed by Nancy Wilson, rather than Ann Wilson, the usual lead singer for the group (though most fans did not realize this until the video was released or they saw the song performed live). The single climbed to #12 on the U.S. Billboard Hot 100 and was also a Top-40 single on the UK Singles Chart, where it peaked at #34.

Cash Box called it a "gorgeous pop/rock number."

The song made appearances in late 1987 episodes of the daytime soap operas All My Children and The Young and the Restless.

Versions and formats
The 7" version was remixed from "Bad Animals" and ran for 3:42; it includes the additional lines 
She's setting you up my friend 
She's gonna break your heart again 
initially before the middle eight and repeated after the final chorus, which were not on the album version or the 12" mix, but feature in the video, which was included on the 1988 VHS release If Looks Could KILL.

The 12" and CD single version featured an extended remix by Tom Lord Alge, running at 7:22. A very limited edition of the UK 12" single release came with a giant double-sided poster incorporating a 1988 calendar.

An even more scarce format of this release is the Japanese 3" CD single, which features an exclusive extended version of Heart's previous single "Alone" clocking in at 5:30, as well as the unedited 12" Remix of "There's The Girl" which does not have an early fade-out. Both of these tracks are exclusive to this Japanese release and not found elsewhere.

Chart performance

Other versions
1987: Mexican singer Sasha Sokol in a version named Dos extraños y una noche.

References 

Heart (band) songs
1987 singles
Song recordings produced by Ron Nevison
Songs written by Holly Knight
Songs written by Nancy Wilson (rock musician)
1987 songs